Scott Coast is the portion of the coast of Victoria Land, Antarctica between Cape Washington and Minna Bluff. It was named by the New Zealand Antarctic Place-Names Committee in 1961 after Captain Robert Falcon Scott, Royal Navy, leader of the Discovery Expedition (1901–1904) and the British Antarctic Expedition (1910-1913), who died on the return journey from the South Pole. Much of the early exploration of this coastline was accomplished by Scott and his colleagues, and many of the names in the region were bestowed by him.

See also 
 Blue Glacier
 Dreschhoff Peak
 Nostoc Flats
 Robbins Hill
 Stoner Peak
 Thoreson Peak
 Weidner Ridge
 Mount Band

External links 

 
Coasts of Victoria Land